The Ballad of Sally Rose is an album by Emmylou Harris released in February 1985.  It marked a significant departure for Harris for two reasons. First, all the songs were written by her and her then-husband Paul Kennerley, while her previous albums had consisted mostly of others' material. Secondly, it is a concept album, loosely based on Harris' relationship with Gram Parsons. The album tells the story of a character named Sally Rose, a singer whose lover and mentor, a hard-living, hard-drinking musician, is killed while on the road. Dolly Parton, Linda Ronstadt and Gail Davies sing harmony on several of the songs.  Many of the songs flow into one another to create a continuous momentum.

Prior to this album, only Harris' 1969 debut Gliding Bird had more than two of her own compositions, a feat she would not repeat until Red Dirt Girl in 2000. Harris has described the album as a "country opera".

Reception 

In a BBC Radio 2 programme recounting her career in 2006, Harris related how the album was a commercial "disaster" upon its release, its relative failure meaning that she would have to work "for money" again. 
Two singles from the album performed disappointingly by Harris' standards, although the single "White Line" was a reasonable success, reaching No. 14 on the country charts.
                                                                                                                                                                                                                                                                                            
The Ballad of Sally Rose was nominated for the Grammy Award for Best Female Country Vocal Performance.

Track listing 
All tracks composed by Emmylou Harris and Paul Kennerley; except where indicated

Personnel 
 Steve Cash - Harmonica
 Barbara Cowart - Backing Vocals
 Gail Davies - Backing Vocals
 Hank DeVito - Acoustic Guitar, Electric Guitar, Pedal Steel, Dobro
 Philip Donnelly - Electric Slide Guitar
 Bessyl Duhon - Accordion
 Ray Flacke - Electric Guitar
 Vince Gill - Electric Guitar, Backing Vocals
 Emory Gordy Jr. - Acoustic Guitar, Bass, String Arrangements
 Emmylou Harris - Vocals, Acoustic Guitar, Backing Vocals
 John Jarvis - Keyboards
 Waylon Jennings - Electric Guitar
 Shane Keister - Keyboards
 Paul Kennerley - Acoustic Guitar, Electric Guitar
 Russ Kunkel - Drums
 Albert Lee - Acoustic Guitar, Electric Guitar, Mandolin
 Larrie Londin - Drums, Percussion
 Dolly Parton - Backing Vocals
 Tom Roady - Percussion
 Linda Ronstadt - Backing Vocals
 Gary Scruggs - Harmonica
 Buddy Spicher - Fiddle
 Barry Tashian - Acoustic Guitar
 Bobby Thompson - Acoustic Guitar, Banjo

Technical personnel 
 Donivan Cowart - Engineer
 Tom Harding - Second Engineer
 Emmylou Harris - Producer
 Paul Kennerley - Producer
 Keith Odle - Second Engineer

Charts

Weekly charts

Year-end charts

References 

Ballad of Sally Rose, The
Ballad of Sally Rose, The
Warner Records albums
Rock operas